Pascal Augustus Struijk (born 11 August 1999) is a professional footballer who plays as a left-back for  club Leeds United. Born in Belgium, he has represented the Netherlands internationally at under-17 level.

Early and personal life
Struijk was born in Deurne in Belgium, but moved to The Hague at the age of three. His paternal grandparents were born in the Dutch East Indies and he is therefore eligible to represent for Indonesia at international level.

Club career

Early career

Struijk started his youth career at ADO Den Haag at the age of seven before moving to Ajax in 2016. In his age group, he would compete with fellow left-sided centre-back and future international Sven Botman and struggled to make an impression, even being tried as a striker in some youth games. With his contract due to expire in the summer of 2018, Struijk joined Leeds United on trial in January of the same year before signing permanently later that month on a three-and-a-half year deal.

Leeds United

His first involvement with the first team came on 13 March 2018, when he was named on the bench against Aston Villa in a 1–0 defeat. Struijk was a regular for the Leeds United under-23 side over the course the 2018–19 season, and he featured in the team that won the Professional Development League on 6 May 2019, beating Birmingham City on penalties having drawn the final 0–0. He was named on the bench by Marcelo Bielsa for both legs of the Championship play-off semi-final against Derby County, but did not come off the bench for either; Leeds lost 4–3 on aggregate over the two legs.

On 10 December 2019, Struijk made his debut for Leeds United, coming on as a 91st-minute substitute for Hélder Costa in a 2–0 victory at home to Hull City. His second appearance came in the following match as a late substitute in a 3–3 draw at home to Cardiff City, with Struijk failing to clear the ball in the build-up to Robert Glatzel's late equaliser. He made his third appearance for the club as a 61st-minute substitute in a 1–0 win against Barnsley on 17 July 2020, with him being praised for his performance as a defensive midfielder. He made his full debut on 19 July 2020, starting in the team that beat Derby County 3–1 in the penultimate game of the season. Another appearance against Charlton Athletic followed in the final game of the season as Leeds finished the 2019–20 season at the top of the Championship, and were thus promoted to the Premier League.

Due to an injury to fellow Leeds United centre-back Liam Cooper, Struijk started Leeds' first league game of the 2020–21 season; a 4–3 away defeat to Premier League champions Liverpool. He signed a new three-and-a-half-year deal on 20 November 2020, lasting until summer 2024. He scored the first goal of his senior career on 14 February 2021 in a 4–2 defeat away to Arsenal, netting a header from a Raphinha corner in the 58th-minute. He scored once in 27 league appearances in his debut Premier League campaign.

On 12 September 2021, Struijk came on in the 33rd minute for the injured Diego Llorente, in a 3–0 home loss to Liverpool. In the 58th minute, Struijk fouled Harvey Elliott, which dislocated Elliott's ankle. Struijk was then sent off in the 60th minute for the tackle. With Leeds in the Premier League relegation places with two matches of the Premier League season remaining, Struijk headed in a 92nd equaliser to draw 1–1 with Brighton & Hove Albion in their penultimate match, before a 2–1 final day victory over Brentford, in which Struijk appeared as a substitute, ensured Leeds' Premier League survival as they finished 17th. Struijk made 29 Premier League appearances over the course of the season.

Struijk started the 2022–23 season playing at left-back due to an injury to Junior Firpo. He scored his first goal of the season in the club's 2–1 loss to Crystal Palace on 9 October 2022. On December 21, 2022, it was announced that Struijk had extended his contract until the summer of 2027.  "It's an amazing club. It was really easy for me to extend because I am really happy here," the BBC cited Struijk as saying.

International career
Eligible to represent Belgium, the Netherlands and Indonesia, Struijk was capped three times by the Netherlands under-17 team in 2016. In September 2022, he was named in a provisional Netherlands squad for international fixtures later that month, before being named in a 39-man provisional Dutch squad for the 2022 FIFA World Cup.

Style of play
Struijk is left-footed. He primarily plays as a centre-back, but can also play as a defensive midfielder, and as a left-back. Struijk has been compared to Dutch international Virgil van Dijk due to his imposing physical play and ability on the ball.

Career statistics

Honours
Leeds United
EFL Championship: 2019–20

References

1999 births
Living people
People from Deurne, Belgium
Association football defenders
Dutch footballers
Netherlands youth international footballers
Belgian footballers
Belgian emigrants to the Netherlands
Dutch people of Indonesian descent
Belgian people of Indonesian descent
Premier League players
Leeds United F.C. players
English Football League players
Dutch expatriate footballers
Expatriate footballers in England
Dutch expatriate sportspeople in England